AcetoneISO is a free and open-source virtual drive software to mount and manage image files. Its goals are to be simple, intuitive and stable. Written in Qt, this software is meant for all those people looking for a "Daemon Tools for Linux". However, AcetoneISO does not emulate any copy protection while mounting.

AcetoneISO also supports Direct Access Archive (*.daa) images because it uses the non-free and proprietary PowerISO Linux software as a backend while converting images to ISO.

In recent releases (as of 2010), AcetoneISO also gained native support at blanking CD/DVD optical discs and burn ISO/CUE/TOC images to CD-R/RW and DVD-+R/RW (including DL) thanks to external open source tools such as cdrkit, cdrdao and growisofs.

Features 
 Mount automatically ISO, BIN, MDF, and NRG without the need to insert admin password. Only single-track images are supported for the moment.
 Burn ISO/TOC/CUE to CD-R/RW optical discs
 Burn ISO images to DVD-+R/RW (including DL)
 A native utility to blank CD-RW, DVD-RW, and DVD-RW discs
 A nice display which shows current images mounted and possibility to click on it to quickly re-open mounted image
 Convert 2 ISO image types: bin mdf nrg img daa dmg cdi b5i bwi pdi 
 Extract images content to a folder: bin mdf nrg img daa dmg cdi b5i bwi pdi 
 Play a DVD Movie Image with Kaffeine / VLC / SMplayer with auto-cover download from Amazon
 Generate an ISO from a Folder or CD/DVD
 Check MD5 file of an image and/or generate it to a text file
 Calculate ShaSums of images in 128, 256, and 384 bit
 Encrypt / Decrypt an image
 Split / Merge image in X megabyte
 Compress with high ratio an image in 7z format
 Rip a PSX CD to *.bin to make it work with ePSXe/pSX emulators
 Restore a lost CUE file of *.bin *.img
 Convert Mac OS *.dmg to a mountable image
 Mount an image in a specified folder from the user
 Create a database of images to manage big collections
 Extract the Boot Image file of a CD/DVD or ISO
 Backup a CD-Audio to a *.bin image
 Complete localization for English, Italian, French, Spanish and Polish 
 Quick and simple utility to rip a DVD to Xvid AVI
 Quick and simple utility to convert a generic video (avi, mpeg, mov, wmv, asf) to Xvid AVI
 Quick and simple utility to convert a FLV video to AVI
 Utility to download videos from YouTube and Metacafe.
 Extract audio from a video file
 Extract a *.rar archive that has a password
 Utility to convert any video for Sony PSP PlayStation Portable
 Display History that shows all images you mount in time

Limitations 
 Does not emulate copy protection mount like Daemon Tools.
 Can't mount correctly a multi-session image. Only the first track will be shown.
 Converting a multi-session image to ISO will result in a loss of data. Only first track will be converted.
 Image conversion to ISO is only possible on x86 and x86-64 CPU architecture due to PowerISO limitations.

Internationalization 
 AcetoneISO is currently translated to: English, Italian, Polish, Spanish, Romanian, Hungarian, German, Czech, and Russian.

See also 

 CDemu
 List of ISO image software

References

Notes

"Featured Linux Download: Advanced CD/DVD management with AcetoneISO", Lifehacker, 2007-07-18. Retrieved on 2008-10-05
"Mount and Unmount ISO,MDF,NRG Images Using AcetoneISO (GUI Tool)", Ubuntu Geek, 2007-08-29. Retrieved on 2008-10-05
"Download of the day: AcetoneISO - extract, browse ISO and other CD/DVD formats under Linux", nixCraft: Insight into Linux admin work, 2008-01-14. Retrieved on 2008-10-05
"Featured Linux Download: AcetoneISO 2.0 Makes Disk Mounting Simple", Lifehacker, 2008-06-04. Retrieved on 2008-10-05

External links

Free optical disc authoring software
Optical disc authoring software
Disk image emulators
Optical disc-related software that uses Qt